Hikmet Karaman (born March 9, 1960) is a Uefa Pro Licensed Turkish football manager. He most recently managed Kayserispor.

In the beginning of his coaching career, Hikmet Karaman worked as an assistant coach for managers like Reinhard Saftig and Mustafa Denizli in Galatasaray and Kocaelispor, as well as Holger Osieck in both Kocaelispor and Fenerbahçe. As a head coach he previously worked for clubs, such as, Kocaelispor, Zeytinburnuspor, Erzurumspor, Çaykur Rizespor, Adanaspor, Kayserispor, MKE Ankaragücü, Ankaraspor, Antalyaspor, Manisaspor, and Gaziantepspor, respectively. During his career he has won the Turkish Cup with Kocaelispor and the Second division league with Çaykur Rizespor and Antalyaspor.

Biography

Professional career and education
He was born in Tirebolu, Giresun, Turkey on March 9, 1960. He holds a UEFA Pro-License and can speak German at advanced level and English at an elementary level. Hikmet Karaman started his Football career in the junior category of Kocaelispor; as a striker first, then as a midfielder, and finally as a left-back. While studying in Berlin, Germany, he played at Rot-Weiß football club. After Rot-Weiß, he played for Normania 08 club in Germany. Then he served as a trainer-player for Berlin Turkspor 1965, where they won the championships of A Liga, Landes Liga, and raised the team to the German third division. Hikmet Karaman received his C, B and A licenses at the Köln Hennef Sportschule. His course lecturers were Bernt Stöber, Holger Osieck, Rute Muller and Berti Vogts. Currently, Hikmet Karaman holds a UEFA pro-license.

1994–2001
In 1994, Hikmet Karaman returned to Turkey and worked for Kocaelispor as assistant coach, together with Reinhard Saftig. In 1995–1996, he was passed to Galatasaray together with Reinhard Saftig, as an assistant manager. That year, Galatasaray played against IFK Göteborg, Manchester United and Barcelona in the UEFA Champions League. In the 1997–1998 season, he came back to Kocaelispor and worked as the assistant for Mustafa Denizli, the former coach of Turkish national football team, Galatasaray, Fenerbahçe and Beşiktaş. Later in 1998, Hikmet Karaman worked with Holger Osieck and won the Turkish Cup. In 1999, he left Kocaelispor and started his career as head coach with Zeytinburnuspor. He stayed there half a season and then moved to Erzurumspor in Turkish Super League. Again only spending half a season there, in 1999, Hikmet Karaman took over Adanaspor. He took the team that was last and finished them within the first eight. He stayed in Adanaspor for two years, until 2001.

2001–2004
In 2001, Hikmet Karaman came back to Kocaelispor, who had only gotten 9 points in 16 games, and completed the season with 41 points. To add to his success, he defeated Galatasaray, coached by Mircea Lucescu, with a score of 3–2 in İstanbul and won the next year's Turkish Cup by defeating another İstanbul giant, Beşiktaş, coached by Christoph Daum with even a more jaw-dropping score of 4–0 in the final. This victory had entitled his team to join the UEFA Cup. Furthermore, during the preparatory camp for this season, his team defeated Arsenal coached by Arsène Wenger with a remarkable score of 4–1. After spending two years in Kocaelispor, Hikmet Karaman worked for Çaykur Rizespor and left this job in February 2004 after a loss to Denizlispor at home.

2004–2010
In the same year, Hikmet Karaman started coaching Kayserispor. He came to the job facing a challenging problem. Kayserispor had only been able to accumulate 2 points in the first 7 weeks of the season before his arrival. He successfully laid the foundations of today's Kayserispor by getting only 4 losses in 17 games in the second half. Thus, he was able to save Kayserispor from relegation. In the summer of 2006, he signed with MKE Ankaragücü again in the Turkish Super League. The following season, he left MKE Ankaragücü for Ankaraspor. Hikmet Karaman helped Ankaraspor, which had only received 3 points in 9 games with no wins, stay in the Super League at the end of the season. In 2008, Hikmet Karaman started managing Antalyaspor in the second division and led the team to a promotion. In the 2009–2010 season, Hikmet Karaman came back to MKE Ankaragücü towards the end of the season and helped the team stay in the Super League, with five wins, in spite of the negative expectations. In 2010, he took over Manisaspor with 0 points after four games, and finished the season with 41 points with, even, some victories against the Turkish giants.

2012–
In the 2012–13 season, Hikmet Karaman came to Gaziantepspor, replacing Abdullah Ercan. On February 4, 2013, Hikmet Karaman terminated his contract with Gaziantepspor and signed with Bursaspor two days later. After defeat of 0–3 at home to FK Vojvodina in UEFA Europa League second qualifying round, he was dismissed from Bursaspor, just before beginning of Turkish Super League 2013–14 season.

Honours

Kocaelispor
Turkish Cup: 2001–02

Managerial statistics

References

External links
Profile at TFF.org
Profile at Mackolik.com

1960 births
Living people
Turkish football managers
Süper Lig managers
Galatasaray S.K. (football) non-playing staff
Antalyaspor managers
MKE Ankaragücü managers
Kayserispor managers
Kocaelispor managers
Adanaspor managers